This is the list of fictional Native Americans from notable works of fiction (literatures, films, television shows, video games, etc.). It is organized by the examples of the fictional indigenous peoples of both the United States and Canada, ones that are historical and others that are modern.

Literature

This section contains examples of the writing of both native and non-native authors.

Comics

Theatre

Film

Live action

Animation

Television

Live action series

Animated series

Radio

Video games

Mascots and others

See also
Stereotypes of indigenous peoples of Canada and the United States
How (greeting)

References

Citations

Sources
Native American Fiction on Goodreads
Multicultural Fiction - Books | A Mighty Girl
Native/Indigenous on Internet Movie Database

 
 
fictional
fictional
fictional
Native Americans